Hapaline is a genus of flowering plants in the family Araceae. It contains 7 species that are found from southern China to Borneo.

They are usually found growing in humid forests in pockets of humus amongst basalt or limestone rocks. The genus was originally given the name Hapale by Heinrich Wilhelm Schott in 1857, but it was changed to Hapaline a year later when it was discovered that a genus of South American marmosets already had been assigned the name in 1811. Hapaline is unique in that it is the only genus in the tribe Caladieae found in the Old World.

Species
Hapaline appendiculata Ridl. - Sarawak
Hapaline benthamiana Schott - Laos, Myanmar, Thailand, Vietnam
Hapaline brownii Hook.f. - Thailand, Peninsular Malaysia
Hapaline celatrix P.C.Boyce - Brunei, Sarawak
Hapaline colaniae Gagnep. - Thailand, Vietnam
Hapaline ellipticifolia C.Y.Wu & H.Li - Yunnan
Hapaline kerrii Gagnep. - Thailand
Hapaline locii V.D.Nguyen & Croat - Vietnam

References

Aroideae
Araceae genera
Flora of Indo-China
Flora of Malesia
Flora of Yunnan